Roskomsvoboda is a Russian non-governmental organization that supports open self-regulatory networks and protection of digital rights of Internet users. The organization aims to counteract censorship on the Internet and to popularize the ideas of freedom of information and self-regulation.

Foundation 
On November 1, 2012, The Roskomsvoboda Foundation held a press conference in Moscow's, Russian Federation Independent Press-Center, the same date as the Russian Internet Restriction Bill became law. Representatives of Pirate Party of Russia and a member of the European Parliament from Pirate Party of Sweden, Amelia Andersdotter, took part in the event.

Activities 
Roskomsvoboda monitors the state Register of information, dissemination of which is prohibited within the Russian Federation, and the Register of Information dissemination organizers (IDO).

The Federal Service for Supervision of Communications, Information Technology and Mass Media (Roskomnadzor) includes messenger services and similar online services (defined by the respective law as Information dissemination organizers IDO upon request of the Federal Security Service (FSB) to the special state Register. Thereafter, such services and websites were obliged to collect and store all user-generated data and information about users online activity, including the content of their messages, calls, shared files, etc., as well as to supply such data to the FSB upon its request.

Campaigns

Digital defense 
"Digital defense" is a public campaign against the "sovereign Runet" that governs internet use in Russia.

As part of the campaign, Roskomsvoboda seeks to prevent the adoption of draft law No. 608767-7 "on the sovereignty of the Runet", submitted to the parliament by senators Andrei Klishas and Lyudmila Bokova, as well as deputy Andrei Lugovoy.

Rules proposed by the draft law will place the routing of the Network under State control, specifically the governmental body Roskomnadzor. Officials of Roskomnadzor would have the authority to order ISPs how to organize Internet traffic routes. It is assumed that ISPs would be obliged to have equipment that filters traffic using deep packet inspection (DPI). Internet exchange points and cross-border traffic shall also be taken under governmental control.

FreeBogatov 
Roskomsvoboda launched the #FreeBogatov campaign in 2017 to support Dmitriy Bogatov who was arrested on April 6, 2017 and accused of calling for extremism and terrorism actions. Dmitry Bogatov was a Tor administrator, whose IP address, among many IP addresses of other Tor nodes, was used by another person while posting calls for riots and participation in an uncoordinated protests.

Demands for the release of Bogatov were sounded at Participants of the Moscow rally for Internet freedom. Charges were finally dropped as a result of the team of lawyers, including Sarkis Darbinian of Roskomvoboda.

References

External links 

 Registers of prohibited sites in Russia
  Registrer of Information dissemination organizers in Russia

Information technology organizations based in Russia